Phrynosoma, whose members are known as the horned lizards, horny toads or horntoads, is a genus of North American lizards and the type genus of the family Phrynosomatidae. The common names refer directly to their horns or to their flattened, rounded bodies, and blunt snouts.

The generic name Phrynosoma means "toad-bodied". In common with true toads (amphibians of the family Bufonidae), horned lizards tend to move sluggishly, often remain motionless, and rely on their remarkable camouflage to avoid detection by predators.  They are adapted to arid or semiarid areas. The spines on the lizard's back and sides are modified reptile scales, which prevent water loss through the skin, whereas the horns on the head are true horns (i.e., they have a bony core). Of the 21 species of horned lizards, 15 are native to the USA. The largest-bodied and most widely distributed of the American species is the Texas horned lizard.

Defenses

Horned lizards use a variety of means to avoid predation. Their coloration generally serves as camouflage. When threatened, their first defense is to remain still to avoid detection. If approached too closely, they generally run in short bursts and stop abruptly to confuse the predator's visual acuity. If this fails, they puff up their bodies to cause them to appear more horned and larger, so that they are more difficult to swallow.

They do this by restricting the blood flow leaving the head, thereby increasing blood pressure and rupturing tiny vessels around the eyelids. The blood not only confuses predators, but also tastes foul to canine and feline predators. It appears to have no effect against predatory birds. Only three closely related species (P. mcallii, P. modestum, and P. platyrhinos) are certainly known to be unable to squirt blood.

While previous thought held that compounds were added to the blood from glands in the ocular sinus cavity, current research has shown that the chemical compounds that make up the defense are already in the circulating blood. It is possible that their diet of large quantities of venomous harvester ants could be a factor; however, the origin and structure of the chemicals responsible are still unknown. The blood-squirting mechanism increases survival after contact with canine predators; the trait may provide an evolutionary advantage. Ocular autohemorrhaging has also been documented in other lizards, which suggests blood-squirting could have evolved from a less extreme defense in the ancestral branch of the genus. Recent phylogenic research supports this claim, so the species incapable of squirting blood apparently have lost the adaptation for reasons yet unstudied.

To avoid being picked up by the head or neck, a horned lizard ducks or elevates its head and orients its cranial horns straight up, or back. If a predator tries to take it by the body, the lizard drives that side of its body down into the ground so the predator cannot easily get its lower jaw underneath.

Population decline
A University of Texas publication notes that horned lizard populations continue to disappear throughout their distribution despite protective legislation. Population declines are attributed to a number of factors, including the fragmentation and loss of habitat from real estate development and road construction, the planting of non-native grasses (both suburban and rural), conversion of native land to pastureland and agricultural uses, and pesticides. Additionally predation by domestic dogs and cats place continued pressure upon horned lizards.

Fire ants (Solenopsis invicta) introduced from South America via the nursery industry's potted plants, pose a significant threat to all wildlife including horned lizards. Phrynosoma do not eat fire ants. Fire ants kill many species of wildlife and are fierce competitors against native ants which horned lizards require for food (with their specialized nutritional content). Fire ants have given all ants a bad reputation and human attempts to eradicate ants, including invasive species and the native species on which the lizards prey, contribute to the continued displacement of native ant species and decline of horned lizards.

The Texas horned lizard (Phrynosoma cornutum) has disappeared from almost half of its geographic range. Their popularity in the early to mid 20th century pet trade, where collectors took thousands from the wild populations to sell to pet distributors, without provision for their highly specialized nutritional needs (primarily formic acid from harvester ants), resulted in certain death for almost all the collected lizards. In 1967 the state of Texas passed protective legislation preventing the collection, exportation, and sale of Phrynosoma, and by the early 1970s most states enacted similar laws to protect and conserve horned lizards in the USA. However, as recently as the early 2000s the state of Nevada still allowed commercial sale of Phrynosoma. Despite limited federal protection in Mexico, horned lizards are still offered in Mexican "pet" markets throughout the country.

In 2014, the Center for Biological Diversity in Tucson petitioned the Oklahoma Department of Wildlife Conservation to have the Texas horned lizard put on the endangered species list due to the massive declines of its population in Oklahoma, where it was once plentiful. The center said it may later seek protection for the animal on a federal level; it also said that reptiles in general are dying off at up to 10,000 times their historic extinction rate, greatly due to human influences.

Species and subspecies

The following 21 species (listed alphabetically by scientific name) are recognized as being valid by the Reptile Database, three species of which have recognized subspecies:
Giant horned lizard, Phrynosoma asio 
Baur's short-horned lizard, Phrynosoma bauri  (disputed; may be conspecific with P. hernandesi)
San Diego horned lizard or Blainville's horned lizard Phrynosoma blainvillii 
Short-tailed horned lizard, Phrynosoma braconnieri 
Great Plains short-horned lizard, Phrynosoma brevirostris  (disputed; may be conspecific with P. hernandesi)
Cedros Island horned lizard, Phrynosoma cerroense 
Texas horned lizard, Phrynosoma cornutum 
Coast horned lizard, Phrynosoma coronatum 
Cape horned lizard, P. c. coronatum 
California horned lizard, P. c. frontale 
Central peninsular horned lizard, P. c. jamesi 
San Luis Valley short-horned lizard, Phrynosoma diminutum  (disputed; may be conspecific with P. hernandesi)
Ditmars' horned lizard or rock horned lizard, Phrynosoma ditmarsi 
Pygmy short-horned lizard, Phrynosoma douglasii 
Sonoran horned lizard, Phrynosoma goodei  
Greater short-horned lizard, Phrynosoma hernandesi 
Flat-tail horned lizard, Phrynosoma mcallii 
Roundtail horned lizard, Phrynosoma modestum 

Mexican Plateau horned lizard or Chihuahua Desert horned lizard, Phrynosoma orbiculare 
P. o. bradti 
P. o. cortezii 
P. o. dugesii 
P. o. orbiculare 
P. o. orientale 
Desert short-horned lizard, Phrynosoma ornatissimum  (disputed; may be conspecific with P. hernandesi)
Desert horned lizard, Phrynosoma platyrhinos 
Southern desert horned lizard, P. p. calidiarum 
Northern desert horned lizard, P. p. platyrhinos 
Guerreran horned lizard, Phrynosoma sherbrookei Nieto-Montes de Oca, Arenas-Moreno, Beltrán-Sánchez, & Leaché, 2014
Regal horned lizard, Phrynosoma solare 
Mexican horned lizard, Phrynosoma taurus 

Note: In the above list, a binomial authority or trinomial authority in parentheses indicates that the species or subspecies was originally described in a genus other than Phrynosoma.

Horned lizard (Phrynosoma) gallery

Symbol
The genus of horned lizards is the official state reptile of Wyoming.
Texas designated the Texas horned lizard (Phrynosoma cornutum) as the official state reptile in 1993 and the "TCU Horned Frog" is the mascot of Texas Christian University in Fort Worth, Texas. TCU is the only known athletic team with the horned lizard as a mascot.

References

External links

 Horned lizard skulls and info at Digimorph.org
 Horned Lizard Conservation Society
 Horned Lizards at UTexas.edu
 Argentine ants linked to declines in coastal horned lizards
 Horned Toads - Field study of Short-horned Lizards by students of Waterville Elementary School

Phrynosoma
Symbols of Wyoming
Lizards of North America
Taxa named by Arend Friedrich August Wiegmann